Asintado is a Philippine action drama television series starring Julia Montes, Shaina Magdayao, Paulo Avelino and Aljur Abrenica. The series was aired on ABS-CBN's Kapamilya Gold afternoon block and worldwide on The Filipino Channel from January 15, 2018, to October 5, 2018, replacing Pusong Ligaw and was replaced by Kadenang Ginto.

Series overview 
 
The series follows the paths of the Ramirez siblings who live polar opposite lives after being separated at a young age. The siblings' lives are thrust into a world of politics, power and corruption that shake their core values, murder their loved ones and potentially destroy themselves.

Season 1 (2018) 

The older sibling Katrina (Shaina Magdayao) is eager to shed her old life for the gilded world of her rich and powerful adopted parents and she shuts off the memory of her younger sister. The younger sibling, Juliana (Julia Montes) does not stop searching for her sister and embraces the loving and poor family who adopts her. Their paths cross as young adults but they do not recognize each other. They are in love with the same man, Gael Ojeda (Paulo Avelino). Their conflict becomes more dangerous than just a love triangle and sibling rivalry.

Season 2 (Finale 2018) 

The season explores the aftermath of Gael's death – from the changes in the characters' relationships, the sacrifices for family, and the consequences of revenge.

Cast and characters

Main cast
 Julia Montes as Ana Dimasalang-Del Mundo / Juliana Ramirez
 Shaina Magdayao as Samantha "Sam" G. Del Mundo-Guerrero / Katrina Ramirez
 Aljur Abrenica as Alexander "Xander" Guerrero
 Paulo Avelino as Gael O. Del Mundo

Supporting cast 
 Lorna Tolentino as Miranda Ojeda
 Cherry Pie Picache as Celeste "Ms. C." Ramos
 Agot Isidro as Hillary Gonzales-Del Mundo
 Nonie Buencamino as Salvador Del Mundo
 Empress Schuck as Monalisa "Mona" Calata
 Arron Villaflor as Ramoncito "Chito" Salazar
 Louise delos Reyes as Yvonne Calata
 Gloria Sevilla as Purisima "Puring" Dimasalang
 Julio Diaz as Melchor Gonzales / Manuel De Dios
 Ronnie Quizon as Jorge Gesmundo
 Chokoleit† as Gaspar "Gracia" Nuevadez
 Karen Reyes as Emilita "Emmy" Gomez
 Ryle Paolo Tan as Jonathan "Tantan" Dimasalang
 Lemuel Pelayo as Diego Gesmundo
 Jean Saburit as Carlotta Candelaria
 Desiree del Valle as Natasha Ojeda-Calderon

Guest cast
 Christian Vasquez as Eric Salazar
 Art Acuña as Maj. Gregorio Calata
 Mari Kaimo as Senator Arturo Galvez
 Giovanni Baldisseri as DMO Employer
 Teroy Guzman as Senator Martin Reynoso
 Bing Davao as Vice President Jaime Montemayor
 Hannah Ledesma as Rowena Barrios
 Charles Kieron as Gavin O. Calderon
 Vivoree Esclito as Charie Tamayo

Special participation
 Luis Alandy as Robert Ramirez
 Tanya Garcia as Criselda Gaspar-Ramirez
 Lito Pimentel as Vicente Dimasalang 
 Myel de Leon as young Juliana/Ana
 Jana Agoncillo as young Katrina/Samantha
 Miguel Diokno as young Gael
 Brandon Axl as young Xander
 Mariella Laurel as young Miranda
 Kazel Kinouchi as young Hillary
 Jess Mendoza as young Salvador

Production

Casting
Angelica Panganiban was originally supposed to co-star in this project, but was forced to drop out due to scheduling conflicts. Isabelle Daza was cast at a later point, but then dropped out due to her pregnancy. She was replaced by Shaina Magdayao. JC Santos was initially part of the main cast, but was pulled by management for a different project. He was replaced by Aljur Abrenica.

Filming
According to an episode of the talk show Tonight with Boy Abunda In July 2017, Julia Montes announced that the series would began principal photography In August 2017. On August 1, 2017, Dreamscape publicity head Eric John Salut confirmed the show started filming.

Title
The drama was originally titled as Victims of Love. In September 2017, the title was changed to Asintado.

Reception

International broadcast

Rerun
The show had a rerun on Kapamilya Channel from January 18, 2021 to October 8, 2021, on Kapamilya Gold afternoon block replacing reruns of The General's Daughter and was replaced by Kapamilya Gold Hits.

This show had reruns during the airing of  Bagong Umaga.

See also
List of programs broadcast by ABS-CBN
List of ABS-CBN drama series

References

External links
 
 

 
ABS-CBN drama series
Philippine action television series
Philippine thriller television series
Philippine political television series
2018 Philippine television series debuts
2018 Philippine television series endings
Television series by Dreamscape Entertainment Television
Filipino-language television shows
Television shows set in the Philippines